Anatoly Vladimirovich Sofronov (19 January 1911 – 9 September 1990) was a Soviet Russian writer, poet, playwright, scriptwriter, editor (Ogonyok, 1953-1986) and literary administrator, the Union of Soviet Writers' secretary in 1948-1953. Sofronov was a Stalin Prize laureate (twice, 1948, 1949) and a recipient of the Order of the Hero of Socialist Labour (1981).

An ominous figure with the reputation of "one of the most feared literary hangmen of the Stalinist era," Sofronov is best remembered for his play Stryapukha (Стряпуха, The Kookie) which was followed by three sequels and the popular comedy film of the same name.

Working with composers like Semyon Zaslavsky, Matvey Blanter, Sigizmund Kats, he co-authored dozens of songs, made popular by the artists like Vladimir Bunchikov, Vladimir Nechayev, Vadim Kozin, Nikolai Ruban, Vladimir Troshin, Olga Voronets, Maya Kristalinskaya, Iosif Kobzon and Nani Bregvadze.

References 

Soviet poets
Writers from Minsk
Soviet dramatists and playwrights
1911 births
1990 deaths
Stalin Prize winners
Heroes of Socialist Labour
Recipients of the Order of Lenin
Soviet memoirists
Communist Party of the Soviet Union members
Burials in Troyekurovskoye Cemetery
Ogoniok editors